= Talimorab =

- Village
- Interactive map of Talimorab
- Coordinates: 15°33′24″N 75°9′3.3″E
- Country: India
- State: Karnataka
- District: Dharwad

Government
  - Type: Panchayat raj
  - Body: Gram panchayat

Population (2011)
  - Total: 1,806

Languages
  - Official: Kannada
- Time zone: UTC+5:30 (IST)
- ISO 3166 code: IN-KA
- Vehicle registration: KA
- Website: karnataka.gov.in

Talimorab is a village in Dharwad district of Karnataka, India.

== Demographics ==
As of the 2011 Census of India there were 320 households in Talimorab and a total population of 1,806 consisting of 929 males and 877 females. There were 224 children ages 0-6.
